Delias apoensis  is a species of pierine butterfly endemic to Mindanao, in the Philippines. The type locality is Mount Apo, Mindanao.

The wingspan is 62–75 mm.

Subspecies
Delias apoensis apoensis (Mt. Apo, Mindanao)
Delias apoensis maizurui Yagishita & Nakano, 1993 (Mt. Kitanlad, Mindanao)

References

apoensis
Butterflies of Asia
Endemic fauna of the Philippines
Lepidoptera of the Philippines
Fauna of Mindanao
Butterflies described in 1928
Taxa named by George Talbot (entomologist)